West Bromwich East is a constituency that is represented in the House of Commons of the UK Parliament  by Nicola Richards of the Conservative Party, who was first elected at the 2019 United Kingdom general election.

Members of Parliament

Constituency profile 
West Bromwich itself is the main town, with a programme of investment in 21st century apartments similar to nearby Birmingham.  Since the recessions of the 1970s and early 1980s, West Bromwich East has suffered from high unemployment, and as a result of the current recession, which began in 2008, unemployment peaked at 14.3%. Only Birmingham, Ladywood nearby had higher unemployment rates in all of Britain.

Workless claimants who were registered jobseekers stood at 7.6% of the population in November 2012; this was higher than the national average of 3.8%, based on a statistical compilation by The Guardian. However, this was lower than in West Bromwich West, with 8.1% of its constituents of working age in receipt of this benefit, which is seen as the lower gauge of the breadth of unemployment.

In the 2016 EU referendum, the constituency voted to leave by 68%, putting it in the top 10% of constituencies in terms of preference for leave.

Boundaries 

West Bromwich East is one of four constituencies covering the Metropolitan Borough of Sandwell, covering the east and northeast of the borough. It includes most of the town of West Bromwich and the part of Great Barr that is in Sandwell.

2010–present: The Metropolitan Borough of Sandwell wards of Charlemont with Grove Vale, Friar Park, Great Barr with Yew Tree, Greets Green and Lyng, Hateley Heath, Newton, and West Bromwich Central.

1997–2010: The Metropolitan Borough of Sandwell wards of Charlemont, Friar Park, Great Barr, Greets Green and Lyng, Hateley Heath, Newton, and West Bromwich Central.

1983–1997: The Metropolitan Borough of Sandwell wards of Charlemont, Friar Park, Great Barr, Hateley Heath, Newton, and West Bromwich Central.

1974–1983: The County Borough of West Bromwich wards of Charlemont, Friar Park, Great Barr, Hateley Heath, Newton, Sandwell, and Tantany.

The seat formerly shared some wards with West Bromwich West: before 2010 instead placed in the latter seat were a small minority of 1,697 electors in the west of the wards of Friar Park and Greets Green and Lyng, also a negligible portion of Wednesbury South was contained in West Bromwich East.

History 
The constituency was formed in 1974 and took its present wards in 1997 (small parts of which remained shared until 2010, see above).

Political history

The seat was held by the Labour Party for the first several decades of its existence, often with substantial majorities. At the 2019 general election, it fell to the Conservatives for the first time, on a swing in excess of 12%.

Elections

Elections in the 2010s

Elections in the 2000s

Elections in the 1990s

Elections in the 1980s

Elections in the 1970s

See also 
 List of parliamentary constituencies in the West Midlands (county)
 Charlemont and Grove Vale

Notes

References

External links
BBC election results (2001, 1997) for West Bromwich East
2005 results from the BBC

Politics of Sandwell
Parliamentary constituencies in the West Midlands (county)
Constituencies of the Parliament of the United Kingdom established in 1974
West Bromwich